The Buckingham Formation is a geologic formation in Florida. It preserves fossils dating back to the Neogene period.

See also

 List of fossiliferous stratigraphic units in Florida

References
 

Neogene Florida